Aplidiopsis is a genus of colonial sea squirts, tunicates in the family Polyclinidae.

Species
The World Register of Marine Species lists the following species:
Aplidiopsis amoyense Tokioka, 1967
Aplidiopsis atlanticus Monniot F., 1975
Aplidiopsis chilensis Sanamyan, Schories & Sanamyan, 2010
Aplidiopsis confluata Kott, 1992
Aplidiopsis discoveryi Millar, 1960
Aplidiopsis gelidus F. Monniot, 1987
Aplidiopsis georgianum (Sluiter, 1932)
Aplidiopsis helenae Redikorzev, 1927
Aplidiopsis hospitale (Sluiter, 1909)
Aplidiopsis indicus Monniot & Monniot, 2006
Aplidiopsis mammillata Kott, 1992
Aplidiopsis ocellatus Monniot & Monniot, 1996
Aplidiopsis pannosum (Ritter, 1899)
Aplidiopsis parvastigma Monniot & Monniot, 1991
Aplidiopsis pyriformis (Herdman, 1886)
Aplidiopsis sabulosa Kott, 1992
Aplidiopsis stellatus Monniot & Monniot, 1984
Aplidiopsis tokaraensis Tokioka, 1954
Aplidiopsis tubiferus F. Monniot, 2001
Aplidiopsis vitreum (Lahille, 1887)

References

Enterogona
Tunicate genera